Mystical Fighter, originally released in Japan as  is a beat 'em up game for the Sega Mega Drive.

The story, designs, and characters are based on Japanese mythology.

Gameplay
Like in most games of the genre, the player (who controls a kabuki) can use combos, flips and swings to fight against tough opponents, fighting them in groups from three to five. Surprinsingly, boss fights are often easier than regular enemies. There is also a time limit, usually about forty seconds, for the player to finish the stage. If the time reaches zero before the player passes the stage, the player will automatically lose the game as it will be declared a defeat. Similar to Golden Axe, the player can use a special magic power, but instead of bottles the player must manually pick up scrolls. The more scrolls the player has, the stronger the magic attack will be; if the player chooses to use this attack, all the scrolls will be consumed.

There are also hidden bonus stages that can be accessed if the player approaches certain doors or rooms. These bonus stages contain magic scrolls, items to refill the character's health bar, or weapons. There are also traps and holes that both the player or the enemies can fall into. The traps and pits do not always hinder the player, and in fact can be beneficial if the player throws an enemy directly into the pit.

Reception

References

External links
 Mystical Fighter at GameFAQs
 Mystical Fighter at MobyGames

1991 video games
KID games
Taito beat 'em ups
Sega Genesis-only games
Sega Genesis games
Video games developed in Japan
Video games set in Japan
Video games based on Japanese mythology